Phyllonorycter cinctata is a moth of the family Gracillariidae. It is known from the Nepal.

The wingspan is 7–8 mm.

The larvae feed on Viburnum erubescens. They mine the leaves of their host plant. The mine has the form of a rather small, elongate, tentiformed blotch occurring upon the lower surface of the leaf, usually situated on the space between two lateral veins. In fully developed state, the upper epidermis of the leaf on the mining part is brownish, much constricted longitudinally, with five or more moderate ridges.

References

cinctata
Moths of Asia
Lepidoptera of Nepal
Leaf miners
Taxa named by Tosio Kumata
Moths described in 1973